The Sleepwalker Killing also known as From the Files of Unsolved Mysteries: The Sleepwalker Killing, is a 1997 TV movie based on a popular real-life case from the Unsolved Mysteries television series. The film was written by June Callwood and Lyle Slack and directed by John Cosgrove. Cosgrove also served as executive producer on the TV series.

Plot
A segment from the Unsolved Mysteries TV series inspired this story, in which Mark Schall kills his mother-in-law and wounds his father-in-law in the middle of the night, then turns himself in. He claims, however, that he cannot remember the crime itself. His defense team finds evidence that suggests the crimes were committed while Mark was sleep walking. They build their defense around this theory.

Cast
Hilary Swank as Lauren Schall
Jeffrey Nordling as Det. Lloyd Boyko
Charles Esten as Mark Schall
Natalija Nogulich as Atty. Brooke McAdam
Lisa Darr as D.A. Mary Ellen Matulus
Sean Murray as Christopher Lane
Victor Love as Det. Ike Nolan
Marisa Coughlan as Tanya Lane
Sam Anderson as Roth Lane
Julianna McCarthy as Eileen Hunter
Joel Polis as Asst. Atty. Jimmy
John Rubinstein as Dr. Frank Corrigan

Releases
The TV movie was originally aired NBC on April 28, 1997 and was released later released on DVD on May 24, 2005.

References

1997 television films
1997 films
1997 crime drama films
American crime drama films
American television films
Crime films based on actual events
1990s English-language films
1990s American films